Trechus eutrechoides is a species of ground beetle in the subfamily Trechinae. It was described by Deuve in 1992.

References

eutrechoides
Beetles described in 1992